The Pareora River is a river of the Canterbury region of New Zealand's South Island. The river ends in a hapua-type river mouth, this means the flow to the ocean is impeded by a gravel bank.

See also
List of rivers of New Zealand

Notes

References

Rivers of Canterbury, New Zealand
Rivers of New Zealand